In astronomy, the Nyx stream is a proposed stellar stream that wraps around the Milky Way galaxy, relatively close to the sun. About 500 stars have been identified in this stream from the Gaia DR2.

See also
 List of stellar streams

References

External links
 Comparing Nyx (purple stars) to the footprint of current spectroscopic surveys (gray) Sky plot
 Evidence for a vast prograde stellar stream in the solar vicinity 6 July 2020
 A Vast Stream of Flowing Stars Is Evidence of The Milky Way's Violent History  MICHELLE STARR 6 JULY 2020

Milky Way
Stellar streams
Astronomical objects discovered in 2019